William Emerson (May 6, 1769 – May 12, 1811) was one of Boston's leading citizens, a liberal-minded Unitarian minister, pastor to Boston's First Church and founder of its Philosophical Society, Anthology Club, and Boston Athenaeum, and father to Ralph Waldo Emerson.

Biography
Emerson was born in Concord, Massachusetts on 6 May 1769, the fifth born and only son of William and Phoebe (Bliss) Emerson.

Family and early life
William Emerson's grandfather, Joseph Emerson was a minister, as was his father, William Emerson Sr. Emerson's father built and inhabited The Old Manse at Concord. He was the chaplain to the Provincial Congress when it met at Concord in October 1774, and he was a chaplain to the Continental Army when war had begun. William Emerson Sr. died of camp fever while on campaign in 1776, when his son William Emerson was 7 years old.

William Emerson Jr. married Ruth Haskins on 25 October 1796 in Boston. She was the daughter of John Haskins of Boston.  The Emersons had eight children: Phebe Ripley Emerson, John Clark Emerson, William Emerson, Ralph Waldo Emerson, Edward Blis Emerson, Robert Bulkeley Emerson, Charles Chauncy Emerson, and Mary Caroline Emerson.

Education
William Emerson attended Harvard College, graduating in 1789. The Reverend Nathaniel Thayer of Lancaster, Massachusetts was his classmate. Prior to his ordination, Emerson taught school.

Ministry

Harvard, MA: 1792–99
On 21 December 1791, the Congregational Church and town of Harvard, Massachusetts extended the call to William Emerson to become their fifth minister. Emerson, who had been preaching on probation, accepted the call 9 April 1792 and was ordained on 23 May 1792. Present at his ordination were ministers from Acton, Boxborough, Concord, East Sudbury, and Littleton, Massachusetts. Concord's Ezra Ripley preached the ordination sermon on Acts 26:18. The town paid the Reverend Emerson $333.30 yearly. While in Harvard, Emerson organized a social library club, serving as its custodian.

On 17 June 1799, the First Church in Boston asked the Harvard church for Emerson's release so that he could become their minister.

Boston, MA: 1799–1811

In 1799, the Reverend William Emerson was dismissed by the Harvard church to become the minister of Boston's First Church, for a bonus of a thousand dollars. After this initial interest, his sermons appear to have roused no great enthusiasm, as George Ticknor noted in the Christian Examiner, September, 1849:  "Mr. Emerson, transplanted to the First Church in Boston six years before Mr. Buckminster's settlement, possessed, on the contrary, a graceful and dignified style of speaking, which was by no means without its attraction, but he lacked the fervor that could rouse the masses, and the original resources that could command the few." He was elected a Fellow of the American Academy of Arts and Sciences in 1803.

In 1804, Emerson founded the Anthology Club, a Boston literary society, and wrote articles for the club's The Monthly Anthology. This publication was the forerunner of the North American Review, America's leading literary journal at the time. The Club's reading room led to the founding in 1807 of the Boston Athenaeum.

In 1806, Emerson was the chaplain for the Massachusetts General Court.

The Reverend William Emerson is buried in the First Church, in Boston.

Notes

References
 

Clergy from Boston
American Unitarians
1769 births
1811 deaths
Ralph Waldo Emerson
Massachusetts colonial-era clergy
People from Concord, Massachusetts
Continental Army staff officers
Fellows of the American Academy of Arts and Sciences
Burials in Boston
Harvard College alumni
People from Harvard, Massachusetts
American people of English descent
American male non-fiction writers